Alex Ochoa (born March 29, 1972) is a Cuban-American former professional baseball outfielder in Major League Baseball and Nippon Professional Baseball.

Career
Ochoa played in part of eight seasons for the New York Mets, Minnesota Twins, Milwaukee Brewers, Cincinnati Reds, Colorado Rockies and Anaheim Angels. He was originally drafted by the Baltimore Orioles in the third round of the 1991 amateur draft, but he never played in the majors for them, as Baltimore traded him to the Mets as part of a trade for Bobby Bonilla in 1995. Ochoa would make his big league debut later that year for New York. Ochoa would eventually be traded seven times in his career, winning a World Series ring with the Angels in the 2002 World Series.

Ochoa played for the Chunichi Dragons from 2003 to 2006. He signed a minor league contract with the Boston Red Sox before the 2006 season and was invited to spring training. He started the season with Triple-A Pawtucket, but was released after a poor performance. On June 18, he signed a deal to play with the Hiroshima Toyo Carp for the rest of the season, and he re-signed with them for the  season.

On January 27, Ochoa was named an assistant coach for the Boston Red Sox. In 2010, he was a special assistant in the Red Sox' baseball operations department, and in 2011, he served as batting coach for the Single-A Salem Red Sox of the Carolina League. On December 23, 2011, he was named the first-base coach on the  Major League staff of Boston Red Sox manager Bobby Valentine.

Television
Ochoa made a cameo appearance on the Japanese television drama Dream Again on Nippon Television while playing for the Carp.

See also

 Hitting for the cycle - the only player in history to have hit for the cycle both as an MLB player and a NPB player. His NPB cycle is noted to be a reverse natural cycle: hit in the order of home run, triple, double, and single.

References

External links

1972 births
Living people
American expatriate baseball players in Japan
Anaheim Angels players
Baseball players from Florida
Boston Red Sox coaches
Bowie Baysox players
Chunichi Dragons players
Cincinnati Reds players
Colorado Rockies players
Frederick Keys players
Gulf Coast Orioles players
Hiroshima Toyo Carp players
Kane County Cougars players
Major League Baseball first base coaches
Major League Baseball outfielders
Milwaukee Brewers players
Minnesota Twins players
New York Mets players
Nippon Professional Baseball outfielders
Norfolk Tides players
Pawtucket Red Sox players
Rochester Red Wings players
People from Miami Lakes, Florida